Lhenice is a market town in Prachatice District in the South Bohemian Region of the Czech Republic. It has about 2,100 inhabitants.

Administrative parts
Villages of Dolní Chrášťany, Horní Chrášťany, Hoříkovice, Hrbov, Třebanice, Třešňový Újezdec, Vadkov and Vodice are administrative parts of Lhenice.

References

Populated places in Prachatice District
Market towns in the Czech Republic
Prácheňsko